The R371 road is a regional road in Ireland linking Roosky on the N4 with the N63 in Lanesborough, on the Ballyleague (western) side of the town. The route is mostly in County Roscommon, except for the initial section leaving the N4 which is in Counties Longford and Leitrim. En route it passes through Scramogue, where it crosses the N5.

See also
Roads in Ireland
National primary road
National secondary road

References
Roads Act 1993 (Classification of Regional Roads) Order 2006 – Department of Transport

Regional roads in the Republic of Ireland
Roads in County Leitrim
Roads in County Roscommon